The Okanagan Country, also known as the Okanagan Valley, is a region located in the Canadian province of British Columbia and the U.S. state of Washington (where it is spelled the Okanogan Country), defined by the basin of Okanagan Lake and the Okanagan River. With an estimated 400,000 residents, the Okanagan Country spans from the Thompson Plateau near Grindrod, British Columbia in the Okanagan to the Okanagan Highland near Douglas County, Washington in the Okanogan. The largest city in the Canadian portion is Kelowna, with a metropolitan population of 194,882  residents as of 2016, while the largest city in the American portion is Omak, with 4,881 residents as of 2011. The region took its current name in honor of the Okanagan term, ukʷnaqín. The mild climate and close proximity to lakes, rivers and mountainous regions make the Okanagan Country an outdoor recreational destination. The region's economy is dominated by the primary sector industries of agriculture and forestry, although economic diversification has also occurred with retirement communities and recreational tourism. The American portion is considered to be more remote than the Canadian division, with approximately 10 percent of the population.

Geography 

The Shuswap Highland and Thompson Plateau, coming out of the unincorporated community of Grindrod, defines the northern border of the region; the terrain here is mountainous and hilly. The southern border is defined by Chelan, Douglas and Grant counties, although portions of these counties lie within the Okanagan Country. The Canada–United States border, which features an official crossing into Osoyoos from Oroville, separates the Okanagan and Okanogan subregions from each other. The Okanagan Highland and Okanagan Basin define the main geographic features, serving as plateau-like hilly areas. The extended region within Chelan, Douglas and Grant divisions make a larger area. The largest municipality by area in the Okanagan Country is Spallumcheen, covering , making it larger than Seattle by land area. The southernmost community is Electric City, in Grant County. Other geographic features include Alta Lake, Columbia River, Cascade Mountains, Kalamalka Lake, North Gardner Mountain, Mahoney Lake, Mara Lake, McIntyre Bluff, Omak Lake, Osoyoos Lake, Similkameen River, Shuswap River, Skaha Lake, Swan Lake, Tuc-el-nuit Lake, Vaseaux Lake and Wood Lake.

Climate 
Like most of southern British Columbia and central Washington, the Okanagan Country experiences a semi-arid climate (Köppen climate classification BSk), with little precipitation, hot summers and moderate winters. Northern communities have more precipitation and receive cooler temperatures. The city of Kelowna is generally considered to be a transition point between the semi-arid south and the somewhat wetter north, accompanied by a change in climate classification to humid continental (Dfb). Vegetation ranges from cactus and sagebrush in the southern portion, to cedar and hemlock trees in the northern portion. The region was affected by 1872 North Cascades earthquake, the state's largest historical earthquake, on December 14, 1872. The center of the earthquake was located at Omak Lake. The earthquake had a magnitude between 6.5 and 7.0 and was followed by an aftershock.

Municipalities

Government 
Population estimates from 2009 and 2011 released by BC Stats and United States Census Bureau indicated that there were over 400,000 residents. The American portion covers 10 percent of the population. Federally, the Canadian portion of the Okanagan Country is part of the British Columbia Southern Interior electoral district, while the American portion is part of Washington's 4th congressional district. The Okanagan Country is part of the North Okanagan, Central Okanagan, Okanagan-Similkameen regional districts, and the Okanogan and Ferry counties; however, portions of Grant, Clark and Douglas counties also lie within the divided region.

References

External links 
 Okanogan Country

Divided regions
Interior of British Columbia
Regions of Washington (state)
Valleys of Washington (state)
Washington (state) wine